Luo Zhi (also Lo Zu; 1915 – 1949), born Luo Changsheng (罗长生), was a revolutionary activist and leader in Xinjiang just prior to the Incorporation of Xinjiang into the People's Republic of China in 1949.

Early life 
Luo Zhi was born Luo Changsheng in Yuangang Village, Yanghe Township in what is today Gaoming District of Foshan City in Guangdong Province in 1915.  In 1924, he accompanied his uncle to Manchuria to pursue studies in Changchun. After the Mukden Incident, he changed his name to Luo Zhi and joined the Northeast Anti-Japanese National Salvation Army to fight against Japanese rule.  In the winter of 1932, he retreated to the Soviet Union.  In 1933, he re-entered China and went to Dihua (now Urumqi).  In 1935, he studied at Tashkent in the Soviet Union before continuing his studies in the politico-economy depart of the Xinjiang Academy, where he was exposed to Marxist-Leninist theories.  From 1939 to 1942, he taught at a teacher’s college and middle school in northern Xinjiang and was twice arrested for activism against Chinese Nationalist rule.

Activism in Xinjiang 
In 1945, Luo Zhi joined the Xinjiang Communist Alliance (新疆共产主义同盟), which in cooperation with the Three Districts Revolution, established the Democratic Revolutionary Party (民主革命党) in Xinjiang.  Luo Zhi was elected to the central committee of the party and secretary of the Dihua chapter.  In Dihua, he worked to lay the ground for the Chinese Communist takeover of the region from the Chinese Nationalists.  In August 1949, he was one of five representatives invited to attend the inaugural meeting of the Chinese People’s Political Consultative Conference to be held in Beijing in September.  On August 27, the entire Xinjiang delegation led by Ehmetjan Qasimi perished in an airplane crash in the Soviet Union.

On October 1, 1949, the People’s Republic of China was founded. Nationalists authorities surrendered to the Chinese Communists and the Three Districts’ authorities also joined the Chinese Communists. Luo Zhi along with the other delegation members, Ehmetjan Qasimi, Abdulkerim Abbas, Ishaq Beg and Dalelkhan Sugirbayev, were hailed by Mao Zedong as martyrs of the Chinese Communist Revolution.

Notes

References 
 
 

People from Foshan
Year of birth uncertain
1949 deaths
Victims of aviation accidents or incidents in the Soviet Union
China–Soviet Union relations
Chinese communists
Political office-holders in Xinjiang
1915 births
Victims of aviation accidents or incidents in 1949